Lanzani is an Italian surname. Notable people with this surname include:
Andrea Lanzani (c. 1645 – 1712), Italian painter
Bernardino Lanzani (1460 – c. 1530), Italian painter
 (1875 – ?), Italian historian
Juan Pedro Lanzani (born 1990), Argentine actor
Loredana Lanzani (born 1965), Italian-American mathematician
 (born 1963), Italian chess player
 (born 1957), Argentine actor
 (born 1951), Italian Catholic bishop

Italian-language surnames